En carne viva may refer to:

 En carne viva (1951 film), a Mexican drama film
 En carne viva (1954 film), a 1954 Argentine film